The Australia women's national under-21 field hockey team, represents Australia in international under-21 field hockey and at the Junior World Cup. The team is controlled by the governing body for field hockey in Australia, Hockey Australia, which is currently a member of the Oceania Hockey Federation (OHF) and the International Hockey Federation (FIH). The team's official nickname is the Jillaroos.

The team's first recorded appearance was at the 1993 Junior World Cup, where the team won a silver medal.

The team's last appearance was during a test series against New Zealand in Hastings, New Zealand from November–December 2018.

History

Tournament Records

Team

Current squad
The following players were named in the squad for the test series against Japan on the Gold Coast, from 11–16 February 2023.

Recent call-ups
The following players have received call-ups to the team in the last 12 months.

Results

Latest Results

Junior Oceania Cup

Japan Test Series

References

Field hockey
Women's national under-21 field hockey teams